Rachel Laybourne (born 19 May 1982) is a British volleyball player. She competed for Great Britain at the 2012 Summer Olympics.

References

British women's volleyball players
Volleyball players at the 2012 Summer Olympics
Olympic volleyball players of Great Britain
1982 births
Living people
Outside hitters